Carla Canales is an American mezzo-soprano singer. She has performed with opera companies and orchestras, and has been recognized as an arts and culture advocate, including her work with the US State Department, the President's Committee on the Arts and Humanities as a Turnaround Artist, the CultureSummit Abu Dhabi, and The Canales Project.
Canales was born in Midland, Michigan to a Bulgarian father and Mexican mother, and received training at the University of Michigan, McGill University, Academy of Vocal Arts in Philadelphia, and the Paris Conservatory. In December 2017, she was honored with a Bicentennial Alumni Award from the University of Michigan, as part of their 200th Anniversary Initiative.

For her work in China, Canales was selected by the Government of China as one of its "1000 Talents" and as such will partner as a guest soloist with the China National Symphony Orchestra from 2018 to 2021. She was a featured performer in a presentation of the Messiah by the Street Symphony in Los Angeles, cited by Alex Ross in The New Yorker as one of the ten most notable performances and recordings of 2015. She also performed at the National Endowment for the Arts 50th anniversary celebration.

As an advocate for arts and culture, Canales has been recognized in multiple capacities, including being named a “Cultural Envoy” by the U.S. Department of State  and serving as a guest speaker at the Aspen Institute, the White House Initiative for Educational Excellence for Hispanics, and the TEDxMidAtlantic conference. She is the first opera singer to be included by Foreign Policy Magazine to its annual listing of 100 Leading Global Thinkers, and the first to be named to the roster of the President's Committee for the Arts and the Humanities’ Turnaround Arts initiative. In 2017, she was appointed to the Artists Committee of the Americans for the Arts.

Canales has been recognized as prominent Hispanic artist and activist. In 2014, she was the first opera singer to receive a Sphinx Medal of Excellence. She has performed in the Hispanic Heritage Awards. In the summer of 2014 she was a featured artist at the White House Initiative for Educational Excellence for Hispanics' Policy Forum for Music and the Arts.

Canales founded the Canales Project in 2016, a not-for-profit organization which states its aim to give “voice to issues of identity and culture through music and conversation and to promote cross-cultural understanding”. She is the Artistic Director of programming for CultureSummit Abu Dhabi.

References

External links 
 
 The Canales Project

Year of birth missing (living people)
Living people
American sopranos
University of Michigan alumni
American musicians of Mexican descent
Hispanic and Latino American musicians
Hispanic and Latino American women singers
21st-century American women